The Packard Formation is a Mesozoic geologic formation. The formation may be from the Kirtlandian land vertebrate age. It has a similar fauna to the Corral de Enmedio Formation.

Paleofauna
The fragmentary remains of indeterminate lepisosteids, trionychids, eusuchians, hadrosaurids, and ceratopsids are known from the Packard Formation.

See also

 List of dinosaur-bearing rock formations
 List of stratigraphic units with few dinosaur genera

Footnotes

References
 Sullivan, R.M., and Lucas, S.G. 2006. "The Kirtlandian land-vertebrate "age" – faunal composition, temporal position and biostratigraphic correlation in the nonmarine Upper Cretaceous of western North America." New Mexico Museum of Natural History and Science, Bulletin 35:7-29. 
 Weishampel, David B.; Dodson, Peter; and Osmólska, Halszka (eds.): The Dinosauria, 2nd, Berkeley: University of California Press. 861 pp. .

Cretaceous System of North America